Rampal chahar (born 10 July 1989) is an Indian Paralympic athlete who specializes in the men’s high jump . He represented india at the 2018 Asian Para Games where he won silver. He has also participated in 2016 Rio Paralympics , 2020 Tokyo paralympics where he stood 6th and 5th Respectively.

Early life 
Rampal Chahar was born in Jajjhar, Haryana. When he was 4 years old, his arm got caught in an agricultural chopper and it resulted in partial amputation of the right arm. He currently holds the gold medal in high jump in 2016 IPC Grand Prix that took place in Tunisia.

Career 
Rampal is a national record holder in T47 para high jump event. He won gold at IPC Athletics Grand Prix in Tunisia 2016 and has won 5 national-level gold medals.

Chahar finished 6th in his event at the 2016 Rio Paralympics. Rampal Chahar finished 6th in his event at 2017 London World Para Championships. Rampal Chahar clinched Silver medal in High Jump T-47 Category at Asian Para Games at Jakarta,Indonesia.

References

1989 births
Living people
Athletes (track and field) at the 2016 Summer Paralympics
Athletes from Haryana
Indian male high jumpers
Paralympic athletes of India
Athletes (track and field) at the 2020 Summer Paralympics